San Carlos Hotel may refer to:

San Carlos Hotel (Pensacola, Florida), formerly on the National Register of Historic Places. Demolished in 1994.
Hotel San Carlos (Phoenix), in Phoenix, Arizona, also known as (and listed on the NRHP as) San Carlos Hotel
San Carlos Hotel (Yuma, Arizona), listed on the NRHP in Arizona